A New Testament may refer to:

A New Testament (Christopher Owens album), 2014
A New Testament, a series of drawings by Domenico Tiepolo
A New Testament, a 1927 poetry collection by Sherwood Anderson

See also
New Testament
The New Testament (disambiguation)